Heathcote School and Science College is a coeducational community secondary school and sixth form in the North Chingford area of the London Borough of Waltham Forest, England.

External links
 Website of Heathcote School and Science College ms hillman is now headteacher, Chingford

Educational institutions with year of establishment missing
Secondary schools in the London Borough of Waltham Forest
Community schools in the London Borough of Waltham Forest
Chingford